Dagpo Rinpoche (born 1932), also known as Bamchoe Rinpoche, is a lama in the Tibetan Buddhist tradition.

Biography
Born in Dhagpo, located in southeastern U-Tsang in Tibet, Dagpo Rinpoche was recognized by the Thirteenth Dalai Lama as the reincarnation of Dagpo Lama Jampel Lhundrup when he was only two years old. At age six, Rinpoche entered Bamchoe Monastery where he first learned to read and write, studying Tibetan Buddhism.

At age thirteen, Dagpo Rinpoche began studying Buddhist philosophy at Dagpo Shedrup Ling. When he was twenty four, he continued his studies at Drepung Monastery.

Throughout his studies, Dagpo Rinpoche had the opportunity to study under many great Buddhist masters such as the Dalai Lama, Ling Rinpoche and Trijang Rinpoche.

In 1959, as the Chinese invaded Tibet, he followed the Dalai Lama into exile in India.
In 1961 he moved to France, where he took up a research and teaching position at INALCO at Sorbonne University in Paris. He started several Buddhist centers, first in France and later in the Netherlands, Switzerland and Asia. He has been particularly active in teaching and reviving Buddhism in Indonesia and Malaysia. 

Dagpo Rimpoche is considered a reincarnation of the 10th century Buddhist master Dharmakīrtiśrī (Tibetan: Serlingpa; Wylie: gser gling pa; Chinese: 金州大師, literally "from Suvarnadvīpa"), also known as Kulānta and Suvarṇadvipi Dharmakīrti, a renowned 10th century Buddhist teacher in Sumatra (Indonesia). In Tibetan Buddhism, Serlingpa is remembered as a key teacher of Atiśa, an 11th century Bengal teacher who responsible for a major transmission of Buddhism to Tibet.

Quotes

See also

References

External links
The Star (Malaysia), March 12, 2007, "Tibetan Spiritual Master Releases New Book"
Institute Ganden Ling
Guru's Feet
Lho Gyu Shertchine Ling
Dagpo Rinpoche's Pathway to Happiness
“Is Buddhism Still Relevant in the 21st Century?”
Canada Tibet Committee

1932 births
Living people
Lamas from Tibet
Buddhist monks from Tibet
French people of Tibetan descent
Dagpo Rinpoche
20th-century lamas
21st-century lamas